This article lists the individuals to have served as Main Opposition Leader of Turkey, since the inception of the republican period in 1923. The Main Opposition Leader is the leader of the largest political party in the Grand National Assembly that is not in cabinet.

Except for two brief periods (1924–25 and 1930), there were no opposition leaders in the one-party period. Furthermore, there were no opposition leaders during the terms of military junta governments in the multi-party period (1960–61 and 1980–83).

List

See also
 Politics of Turkey
 Government of Turkey
 Grand National Assembly of Turkey
 Speaker of the Grand National Assembly

References

Politics of Turkey
Political office-holders in Turkey
Opposition leaders
Main
Turkey
Turkey